Guillaume Dufresne d'Arsel (born in 1668 in Saint-Malo, France) established French rule of Mauritius under the French East India Company in 1715.

References

Year of birth uncertain
1738 deaths
Governors of Isle de France (Mauritius)
French colonial governors and administrators
1668 births